The men's mass start race of the 2014–15 ISU Speed Skating World Cup 1, arranged in the Meiji Hokkaido-Tokachi Oval in Obihiro, Japan, was held on 16 November 2014.

Lee Seung-hoon of South Korea won the race, while Kim Cheol-min of South Korea came second, and Bart Swings of Belgium came third.

Results
The race took place on Sunday, 16 November, scheduled in the afternoon session, at 17:45.

References

Men mass start
1